The Triumph TR4 is a sports car produced by the Triumph Motor Company from 1961 to 1965. As the successor to the TR3A, the car was based on the chassis and drivetrain of the previous TR sports cars, but with a modern body designed by Michelotti.

In spite of its modern styling, a total of only 40,253 cars were built during its 5-year production run.  In comparison, the TR2 sold 8,635 units in its 3-year run from 1953–1955; 74,800 TR3s in an 8-year run from 1955 to 1962; 94,500 TR6s in an 9-year run from 1968–1976 and 111,500 TR7s over a 7-year run from 1975–1981.

Styling and coachwork 
Code named "Zest" during development, the new TR4 body style did away with the cutaway door design of the previous TRs to allow for wind-down (roll-up) windows in place of less convenient side-curtains. The angular rear allowed a boot (trunk) with considerable capacity for a sports car.

Advanced features included the use of adjustable fascia ventilation, and the option of a unique hard top that consisted of a fixed glass rear window (called a backlight) with an integral rollbar and a detachable, steel centre panel (aluminium for the first 500 units). This was the first such roof system on a production car and preceded by five years the Porsche 911/912 Targa, which has since become a generic name for this style of top.

On the TR4 the rigid roof panel was replaceable with an easily folded and stowed vinyl insert and supporting frame called a "Surrey top". The entire hard top assembly is often mistakenly referred to as a Surrey top. In original factory parts catalogues the rigid top and backlight assembly is listed as the Hard Top kit. The vinyl insert and frame are offered separately as a Surrey top.

Features such as wind-down windows were seen as a necessary step forward to meet competition and achieve good sales in the important US market, where the vast majority of TR4s were eventually sold. Dealers had concerns that buyers might not fully appreciate the new amenities, therefore a special short run of TR3As (commonly called TR3Bs) was produced in 1961 and '62.

As of Q2 2022 there were approximately 953 licensed and 216 SORN TR4s registered with the DVLA.

Engineering

The pushrod Standard inline-four engine, was designed for use by the Ferguson TE20 tractor. The TR4 engine was continued from the earlier TR2/3 models, but the displacement was increased from 1991cc to 2138 cc in the TR4 by increasing bore size. Gradual improvements in the manifolds and cylinder head allowed for some improvements culminating in the TR4A model. The 1991 cc engine became a no-cost option for those cars destined to race in the under-two-litre classes of the day. Some cars were fitted with vane-type superchargers, as the three main bearing engine was prone to crankshaft failure if revved beyond 6,500 rpm; superchargers allowed a TR4 to produce much more horsepower and torque at relatively modest revolutions. The TR4, in common with its predecessors, was fitted with a wet-sleeve engine, so that for competition use the engine's cubic capacity could be changed by swapping the cylinder liners and pistons, allowing a competitor to race under different capacity rules (i.e. below or above 2 litres for example).

Other key improvements over the TR3 included a wider track front and rear, slightly larger standard engine displacement, full synchromesh on all forward gears, and rack and pinion steering. In addition, the optional Laycock de Normanville electrically operated overdrive could now be selected for second and third gears as well as fourth, effectively providing the TR4 with a seven-speed manual close ratio gearbox.

The TR4 was originally fitted with 15x4.5" disc wheels. Optional 48-lace wire wheels could be ordered painted the same colour as the car's bodywork (rare), stove-enamelled (matte silver with chrome spinners, most common) or in matte or polished chrome finishes (originally rare, but now more commonly fitted). The most typical tyres originally fitted were 590-15 bias ply or optional radial tyres. In the US at one point, American Racing alloy (magnesium and aluminium) wheels were offered as an option, in 15x5.5" or 15x6" size. Tyres were a problem for original owners who opted for 60-spoke wire wheels, as the correct size radial-ply tyre for the factory rims was 155–15, an odd-sized tyre at the time only available from Michelin at considerable expense. Some original TR4 sales literature says the original radial size was 165–15.  The much more common 185-15 radials were too wide to be fitted safely. As a result, many owners had new and wider rims fitted and their wheels re-laced.

In motorsport
The TR4 had a number of racing successes in America, primarily through the efforts of the Californian engineer Kas Kastner and his top driver, Bob Tullius. In 1961 the TR4 won first in class and thirtieth overall at Sebring.  That car was driven by George Waltman and Nick Cone.  The serial number of that TR4 is CT 7L.  In 1962 the TR4 won the E production national championship, following which the SCCA reclassified the car to D production, and Tullius won that class title in 1963 and '64.  Soon after the TR4 was introduced, Kastner along with Mike Cook, who was in the advertising department at Triumph in New York City, convinced the company to provide three new TR4s to race in the 12 Hours of Sebring race in 1963.  Beginning in September 1962 the cars were prepared in California, where Kastner was service supervisor for Triumph.  The cars were then flown to Florida for the endurance race in March 1963.  These cars were driven by Mike Rothschild and Peter Bolton from England, Bob Tullius, Charlie Gates, Ed Deihl, Bob Cole, Bruce Kellner and Jim Spencer and finished overall 22nd, 24th, and 35th of 65 entries, and first, second and fourth in the 2.5 GT class.  This was the beginning of the Triumph Competition Department Kastner headed for several years and used to publicize and market the TR4.  The next year a privateer TR4 finished dead last in the 1964 running of the Sebring 12-hour race and Kas Kastner returned to Sebring in 1966 with four carefully prepared TR4As, three of which finished winning the class. In 1966 at Sebring, Tullius threw a piston in the most highly tuned car and did not finish.  Perhaps the greatest racing victory for the TR4A was at Daytona, where a Kastner-prepared car driven by Charlie Gates won the 1965 SCCA D modified championship against Ferraris and other prepared race car exotica.

The TR4 continues to be raced in vintage sports car events and even won an SCCA class championship as late as 1991. In Australia the TR4 was a common sight at hill-climb events and various club rallies and circuit racing events.  In 1964 the factory sponsored Team Triumph entered three TR4s in the Canadian Shell 4000 rally. These "works" cars were reportedly built with gussets on the chassis members and aluminum body panels to strengthen and lighten the car.  After import, the engines were prepared by Kastner in New York, where they were also fitted with lightweight magnesium wheels.  Although they did not place well in the rally, the surviving cars have become quite valuable, one of which is owned by Neil Revington, the proprietor of Revington TR in the UK. Indeed, the TR4 became a celebrated rally car in Europe and the UK during early to mid-sixties, and various replicas are still campaigned by privateers in vintage rally events throughout Europe.

TR4A

In 1965, the TR4A with IRS or independent rear suspension superseded the TR4. Apart from the rear suspension, which used trailing arms and a differential bolted to the redesigned chassis frame and a number of small styling changes and refinements, the two models appear nearly identical. In fact, an estimated 25 per cent of TR4As were not equipped with IRS, but instead reverted to a live axle design similar to the TR4, which was adapted to fit the new chassis.

Dové GTR4
Perhaps the rarest production TR4 model is the Dové GTR4 (and GTR4A) – a TR4 rebuilt as a coupé by a specialist coachbuilder for the Dove dealership in Wimbledon, London; only 43 were produced. The conversions were by Harrington Motor Bodyworks, mostly known for construction of the Harrington Alpine, a similarly converted Sunbeam Alpine. Although most were based on the TR4 model, the sales brochure pictures a TR4A version of these cars. The engines came with such period extras as a heater in the water jackets to assist early morning starts. Some were fitted with fully balanced motors by Jack Brabham Motors or Laystall Engineering in London, which was offered as an option in the sales catalogue. Two jump seats were placed behind the driver's seat using identical materials to the originally equipped standard TR4. A wood-rimmed wheel with riveted perimeter was fitted to some models along with auxiliary lamps under the front bumper bars. A metallised identifying sticker with "Dové" on it was fitted to the glovebox lid. On the rear deck to the left below the lid, was another identifying badge with the Dové logo. The side window glasses were specially shaped with a flat top edge to fit the new roof line. Each Dové was an individual order and some variation occurred in each car. Tinted swing-down see-through acrylic sun visors were custom fitted. They were originally conceived by L.F. Dove & Co. as their attempt to fill the GT category for Europe, hence the French nomenclature with an inflection at the end of the word Dové. The cars were priced at £1250, on the high, uncompetitive side. One example was exported for sale through Australian Motor Industries in Melbourne, Australia. A road test of one of these cars was reported in Autocar magazine dated 7 June 1963. Up to a dozen of the cars are known to still exist.

Specifications
Cost When New - £1095
Top Speed - 
Power -  at 4,600 rpm
Torque - 1529 lb/in (127 lb/ft)
Overall Fuel Consumption - 
Axle Ratio - 3.7:1 (4.1:1 optional)
Unladen Weight -

Performance

References

External links

 Informational website dedicated to the Triumph TR4

TR4
Sports cars
Cars introduced in 1961
1960s cars
Roadsters
Rear-wheel-drive vehicles
24 Hours of Le Mans race cars